Peter Blythe (14 September 1934 – 27 June 2004) was an English character actor, probably best known as Samuel "Soapy Sam" Ballard in Rumpole of the Bailey.

Early life
Born in Yorkshire, Blythe studied drama on scholarship at the Royal Academy of Dramatic Art after serving in the Royal Air Force. He began his professional career as a repertory player with the Living Theatre Company, the Nottingham Playhouse and the Royal Shakespeare Company. He made his West End debut in 1965.

Selected theatre credits
Blythe was frequently associated with the director Peter Hall and the playwright Alan Ayckbourn.

 The Creeper (St. Martin's Theatre, 1965): Maurice
 Early Morning (English Stage Company/Royal Court, 1969): Lord Mennings
 So What About Love? (Criterion Theatre, 1969): Robert
 Absurd Person Singular (Criterion Theatre, 1974): Sidney
 The Clandestine Marriage (Savoy Theatre, 1975): Sir John Melvil
 The Return of A. J. Raffles (Royal Shakespeare Company/Aldwych Theatre, 1975): Lord Alfred Douglas
 The Chairman (Globe Theatre, 1976): Peter Frame (Clarence Derwent Award)
 Sextet (Criterion Theatre, 1976): Roger
 Caught in the Act (Garrick Theatre, 1981): Bill Taylor
 The Hard Shoulder (Aldwych Theatre, 1983): David
 Number One (The Queen's, 1984): Bernard
 Pravda (National Theatre/Olivier Theatre, 1985): Michael Quince, MP
 The Government Inspector (National Theatre/Olivier Theatre, 1985): Artemy Zemlyanika
 Futurists (National Theatre/Cottesloe Theatre, 1986): Lenin/Romanov
 Woman in Mind (Vaudeville Theatre, 1986): Bill
 The Living Room (Royalty Theatre Company, 1987): Michael Dennis
 Julius Caesar (Compass Theatre Company, UK national tour, 1990): Cassius
 The Hothouse (Chichester Festival Theatre; The Comedy, 1995): Lobb
 Hedda Gabler (Chichester Festival Theatre, 1996): Judge Brack
 Peter Hall Company at the Old Vic, 1997: Waste (Sir Charles Cantilupe, MP), The Provok'd Wife (Lord Rake), King Lear (Duke of Albany)
 Flight (National Theatre/Olivier Theatre, 1998): Commander in Chief of the White Army
 Hay Fever (Savoy Theatre, 1999): David Bliss
 Hamlet (Royal National Theatre, US national tour and some UK performances, 2001): Polonius/The Grave-digger
 The Royal Family (Theatre Royal Haymarket, 2001): Gilbert Marshall
 Mrs. Warren's Profession (Strand Theatre, 2002): Mr. Praed
 Humble Boy (Gielgud Theatre, 2002): Jim
 Henry V (National Theatre/Olivier Theatre, 2003): Duke of Exeter

Film and television
Blythe worked in films only rarely and usually in minor roles; his most substantial part was also in his last film appearance, The Luzhin Defence (2000). Other film credits include two films for Hammer Film Productions, A Challenge for Robin Hood (1967) and Frankenstein Created Woman (also 1967); his most successful film was Carrington (1995).

By contrast, Blythe appeared in several dozen television series, miniseries and films, most notably as Samuel Ballard, QC in Rumpole of the Bailey (1983–92). He guest-starred in episodes of The Avengers (1966 A Sense of History episode), UFO (episodes "Destruction" and "The Psychobombs"), Callan, Van der Valk, New Scotland Yard, Special Branch, Agatha Christie's Partners in Crime, Agatha Christie's Poirot, Inspector Morse, Maigret, The Inspector Alleyn Mysteries, Between the Lines, Pie in the Sky, Goodnight Sweetheart, Dalziel and Pascoe and Foyle's War (aired posthumously), among many others. His miniseries appearances included The Barchester Chronicles, After the War and The Alan Clark Diaries. He narrated the 1970 TV comedy special Cucumber Castle starring the Bee Gees.

Authorship
One of Blythe's plays, Tom, Dick and Harry, was produced at the Stephen Joseph Theatre, Scarborough in 1972 directed by Alan Ayckbourn. He also wrote two poetry chapbooks, Spring and The Light.

Personal life
Blythe lived for eight years with Harriet Walter; the couple were planning to marry at the time of his death. He had a daughter from an earlier marriage.

Peter Blythe died on 27 June 2004 aged 69, shortly after being diagnosed with lung cancer.

Filmography

Film

Television

External links

 Guardian obituary

1934 births
2004 deaths
Deaths from lung cancer in England
English male stage actors
English male television actors
Male actors from Yorkshire
English male Shakespearean actors
Alumni of RADA
20th-century Royal Air Force personnel